Pithecopus gonzagai is a species of frog in the family Hylidae, endemic to Brazil.  It lives several states north of the Rio São Francisco.

Original description

References

Frogs of South America
Endemic fauna of Brazil
Amphibians described in 2020
gonzagai